Peščanik is a 1972 novel by Yugoslav novelist Danilo Kiš, translated as Hourglass by Ralph Manheim (1990). Hourglass tells the account of the final months in a man's life before he is sent to a concentration camp, and is the author's best known work. Hourglass is in part based on the life of the author's Jewish father, who was murdered in Auschwitz.

References

1972 novels
Serbian novels
Novels set in Serbia